Ethmia vulcanica is a moth in the family Depressariidae. It is found in Namibia.

References

Moths described in 2004
vulcanica